Marcel Boivin (November 2, 1912 – April 30, 1974) was a Canadian politician, agent, businessman and manager. He was elected to the House of Commons of Canada as a Member of the Liberal Party to represent the riding of Shefford in the 1945 election. He was re-elected in 1949, 1953, 1957 and 1958 then defeated in 1962.

His father, Georges Henri Boivin, was also an MP.

References

1912 births
1974 deaths
Liberal Party of Canada MPs
Members of the House of Commons of Canada from Quebec
People from Granby, Quebec